Frederick Clinton Daniels (December 28, 1923 – July 23, 2005) was a professional baseball player.  He was a second baseman for one season (1945) with the Philadelphia Phillies.  For his career, he compiled a .200 batting average in 230 at-bats, with ten runs batted in.

He was born in Gastonia, North Carolina and later died in Statesville, North Carolina at the age of 81.

External links

Philadelphia Phillies players
Major League Baseball second basemen
Anniston Rams players
Newark Bears (IL) players
Shreveport Sports players
Sumter Chicks players
Utica Blue Sox players
Baseball players from North Carolina
1923 births
2005 deaths
Concord Weavers players
Mooresville Moors players